Fåberg is a former municipality in the old Oppland county, Norway. The  municipality existed from 1838 until 1964. Now, it is part of Lillehammer Municipality in Innlandet county. The administrative centre was the village of Fåberg.

History
The prestegjeld of Faaberg (later spelled Fåberg) was established as a municipality on 1 January 1838 (see formannskapsdistrikt law). On 1 January 1906, a part of Faaberg (population: 140) that was adjacent to the town of Lillehammer was transferred from Faaberg to the town of Lillehammer. During the 1960s, there were many municipal mergers across Norway due to the work of the Schei Committee. On 1 January 1964, Fåberg Municipality (population: 13,381) was merged with the town of Lillehammer (population: 5,905) to form a new Lillehammer Municipality.

Name
The municipality (originally the parish) was named after the old Fåberg farm because the first Fåberg Church was built there. The meaning of the first element is unknown. Prior to 1921, the name was spelled "Faaberg".

Government
All municipalities in Norway, including Fåberg, are responsible for primary education (through 10th grade), outpatient health services, senior citizen services, unemployment and other social services, zoning, economic development, and municipal roads. The municipality was governed by a municipal council of elected representatives, which in turn elected a mayor.

Municipal council
The municipal council  of Fåberg was made up of representatives that were elected to four year terms.  The party breakdown of the final municipal council was as follows:

Notable residents
Notable people that were born or lived in Fåberg include:
 Carl Sofus Lumholtz (1851–1922), explorer, ethnographer, and archaeologist
 Kalle Løchen (1865–1893), painter and actor
 Lars Olsen Skrefsrud (1840–1910), missionary and language researcher in India

See also
List of former municipalities of Norway

References

Lillehammer
Former municipalities of Norway
1838 establishments in Norway
1964 disestablishments in Norway